Govindapur is a small village in Chegunta mandal of Telangana region. The village is located at a distance of 18 km from the sub-district headquarter Chegunta, and 82 km from district headquarter Sangareddy.

References

Villages in Medak district